iQIYI is a Chinese video hosting website created in 2010, it started producing original content in 2011.

Original programing

Drama 

Number of original drama shows:

International Co-productions & Regional original programming

Anime/Children

Variety/Reality

Music

Exclusive distribution

Movie

Original iQIYI web film

Exclusive web film distribution (from independent studio) 
  Metanoia-Mexico | Sci Fi/LGBTQ | 3 December 2021 | 8 minutes Short Film

Notes

References 

iQiyi